A tortilla is a soft, thin flatbread made out of maize or wheat flour.

Tortilla may also refer to:

Omelette, an egg dish called a tortilla in European and South American Spanish
Spanish omelette or Spanish tortilla, an egg-and-potato dish in Spanish cuisine
Tortilla (restaurant chain), a UK-based Mexican-cuisine restaurant chain

See also 
 Tortilla chip, a snack food
 Tortiya, a town in Ivory Coast